The 2019 WNBA draft was the league's draft for the 2019 WNBA season. On March 19, the league announced the draft would be held on April 10 at Nike New York headquarters. The first round was televised on ESPN2, and the second and third rounds were televised on ESPNU.

On August 28, 2018, the league held the draft lottery between the four non-playoff teams – Indiana, New York, Las Vegas, and Chicago. The Aces won the top pick for the third year in a row. For just the second time, all five players of one school's starting lineup was drafted, when Notre Dame's starting five were selected in the first 20 picks.

Draft lottery
The lottery selection to determine the order of the top four picks in the 2019 draft took place on August 28, 2018 during halftime of the 2018 WNBA Playoffs game between the Atlanta Dream and Washington Mystics.

Lottery chances
All odds out of 1,000 based on percentages. (The 11-12-13-14 combination is ignored.) 
Indiana Fever (44.2%) 
Las Vegas Aces (27.6%) - WON
Chicago Sky (17.8%)
New York Liberty (10.4%)

The lottery odds were based on combined records from the 2017 and 2018 WNBA seasons. The Aces won the Draft Lottery for the third year in a row, previously selecting Kelsey Plum in 2017 and A'ja Wilson in 2018. Plum was selected when the team was still located in San Antonio.

The order of selection for the remainder of the first round as well as the second and third round was in inverse order of the teams’ respective regular-season records solely from 2018.

Draft invitees
On April 9, 2019, one day before the Draft, the WNBA released the names of the players who would be invited to be in attendance at the draft. 
Kristine Anigwe, California
Kalani Brown, Baylor
Napheesa Collier, UConn
Sophie Cunningham, Missouri
Asia Durr, Louisville
Megan Gustafson, Iowa
 Han Xu, Xinjiang Magic Deer, China
Teaira McCowan, Mississippi State
Arike Ogunbowale, Notre Dame
Katie Lou Samuelson, UConn
 Alanna Smith, Stanford
Jackie Young, Notre Dame

Three of these players were not chosen until the second round, with Cunningham, Han, and Gustafson respectively chosen 13th, 14th, and 17th overall.

Key

Draft selections

Round 1

Round 2

Round 3

Draft-day trades
Draft-day trades occurred on April 10, 2019, the day of the draft.

 The Atlanta Dream traded Brianna Turner (Notre Dame) for Marie Gülich (from Phoenix Mercury).
 The Minnesota Lynx traded Natisha Hiedeman (Marquette) for Lexie Brown (from Connecticut Sun).

Footnotes

References

Women's National Basketball Association Draft
Draft
WNBA draft
WNBA draft
Basketball in New York City